Two ships of the Royal Navy have borne the name HMS Seawolf:

  was an  launched in 1918 and sold in 1931.
  was an S-class submarine launched in 1935 and sold in 1945.

See also
 Seawolf (disambiguation)

Royal Navy ship names